Wierzbica Dolna  (German: Deutsch Würbitz, 1936–1945 Niederweiden O.S.) is a village in the administrative district of Gmina Wołczyn, within Kluczbork County, Opole Voivodeship, in south-western Poland.

Geography 
Wierzbica Dolna is located in the northwestern part of Upper Silesia. The village of Wierzbica Dolna is about 8 km northwest of the municipality seat Wołczyn, 21 km northwest of the district town of Kluczbork and 53 kilometers north of the voivodeship capital Opole.

History 
The village belonged to Germany until 1945. At the end of World War II, it fell under Polish administration and was renamed Wierzbica Dolna. In 1950 it was incorporated into the Opole Voivodeship. In 1999, Wierzbica Dolna became part of the newly founded Kluczbork County.

References

Wierzbica Dolna